Associated Film Distribution was a British film distribution company. It was set up in the 1970s by ITC Entertainment and EMI Films to distribute their films in the US.

Michael Deeley, head of EMI at the time, opposed the move. He thought it was motivated by Sir Lew Grade's belief that his films had failed in the US due to poor distribution.

The company was launched in 1978 with $40 million in capitalisation. It aimed to distribute 12 films a year. The initial slate included:
The Story of Maria Callas directed by Zeffirelli
two films from Alan Carr, Cafe Society and a musical
The Wife directed by John Schlesinger
an Ingmar Bergman film
Movie Movie Two - a sequel to Movie Movie (never made)
Saturn 3
French Vanilla directed by Stanley Donen (never made)
The Muppet Movie
Escape to Athena
Firepower
Blood Feud
Raise the Titanic
The Legend of the Lone Ranger
The Chinese Bandit (never made)
Eleanor Roosevelt's Niggers
The Golden Gate from the novel by Alistair MacLean (never made)
Green Ice
The Gemini Contenders and The Scarlatti Inheritance from novels by Robert Ludlum
Trans Siberian Express

Universal Pictures

The company wound up in 1981, having enjoyed only one hit, The Muppet Movie. The theatrical rights to their films and distribution of their future projects were acquired by Universal.

Sidney J. Sheinberg, president of MCA who owned Universal, said the agreement went for three years involved all the movies that A.F.D. had ready for distribution including:

The Legend of the Lone Ranger (1981)
The Great Muppet Caper (1981)
Honky Tonk Freeway (1981)
On Golden Pond (1981)
Barbarosa (1982)
Evil Under the Sun (1982)
Frances (1982)
Sophie's Choice (1982)
The Dark Crystal (1982)
Second Thoughts (1983)
Bad Boys (1983)
Tender Mercies (1983)
Cross Creek (1983)
Slayground (1983)

Grade said, "If we had ordinary pictures, I doubt that Universal would have wanted us."

Select filmography
Firepower (1979)
The Muppet Movie (1979)
Escape to Athena (1979)
Love and Bullets (1979)
Killer Fish (1979)
Saturn 3 (1980)
Blood Feud (1980)
The Changeling (1980)
Can't Stop the Music (1980)
Raise the Titanic (1980)
Times Square (1980)
Borderline (1980)
Inside Moves (1980)
The Jazz Singer (1980)
The Mirror Crack'd (1980)
Hard Country (1981)
From the Life of the Marionettes (1981)

References

1978 establishments in the United Kingdom
1981 disestablishments in the United Kingdom
Film distributors of the United Kingdom
ITC Entertainment
EMI